Semana Jr. is a Colombian-based monthly magazine. The magazine is a version of Semana geared towards children aged 6 through 12 years. 

The content of the magazine covers varied interests like popular children's film and games reviews, and providing emphasis on history and science articles and activities; to some degree varying between the issues, it also contains some national and international affairs news coverage redacted for a younger audience. The magazine often partners with educational institutions and organization to reach out to young readers and create interest in journalism by encouraging readers to submit their cartoons, articles, and pictures, as well as setting up interviews by children with famous celebrities and athletes.

References

External links

1999 establishments in Colombia
Children's magazines
Magazines published in Colombia
Magazines established in 1999
Mass media in Bogotá
Monthly magazines
Spanish-language magazines